St Giles Church is a redundant Anglican church in Carburton, Nottinghamshire.

History

The church is an unusual shape and dates back to the early 12th century; parish records date back to the 1530s.

The church is Grade II* listed by the Department for Digital, Culture, Media and Sport as it is a particularly significant building of more than local interest.

This church was declared redundant by the Church of England in 2018 and closed for worship.  A notice in the porch now states that visits inside cannot be allowed as the building has been deemed unsafe.

Gallery

References

Church of England church buildings in Nottinghamshire
Grade II* listed churches in Nottinghamshire
Anglo-Catholic church buildings in Nottinghamshire